Michel Callon (born 1945) is a professor of sociology at the École des mines de Paris and member of the Centre de sociologie de l'innovation. He is an author in the field of Science and Technology Studies and one of the leading proponents of actor–network theory (ANT) with Bruno Latour.

Recent career 
Since the late 1990s, Michel Callon has led efforts to apply ANT approaches to study economic life, notably economic markets. This body of work interrogates the interrelation between the economy and economics, highlighting the ways in which economics and economics-inspired disciplines such as marketing shape the economy (Callon 1998 and 2005).

Bibliography

Books 
 
 Callon, Michel (ed.) (1998). The Laws of the Markets. London: Blackwell Publishers.
 Callon, Michel (2005). "Why virtualism paves the way to political impotence", Economic Sociology - the European electronic newsletter. Read as PDF
 Callon, M., Lascoumes, P., & Barthe, Y. (2009). Acting in an uncertain world: an essay on technical democracy. The MIT Press.

Chapters in books 
 Callon, Michel (1980). "Struggles and Negotiations to Define What is Problematic and What is Not: The Socio-logic of Translation." pp. 197–221 in The Social Process of Scientific Investigation, edited by Karin D. Knorr. Dordrecht: Reidel Publishing.
 Callon, Michel (1986). "Some Elements of a Sociology of Translation: Domestication of the Scallops and the Fishermen of St Brieuc Bay." pp. 196–233 in Power, Action and Belief: A New Sociology of Knowledge, edited by John Law. London: Routledge & Kegan Paul.

See also 
 Obligatory passage point

External links 
 Michel Callon's University Home Page

Innovation economists
French sociologists
Academic staff of Mines Paris - PSL
French engineers
Living people
Sociologists of science
1945 births
Actor-network theory
French male writers